The 1967 All-Ireland Senior Camogie Championship was the high point of the 1967 season in Camogie. The championship was won by Antrim who defeated Dublin by a four-point margin in the final, which went to a replay. It ended a remarkable record of 18 All Ireland titles in 19 years by Dublin, an eight-in-row 1948-‘55 and a ten-in-a-row 1957-’66.

Season
Cork won the Munster championship and succumbed to five Antrim goals from Lily Scullion in the All Ireland semi-final.

Final
The final took place in a  downpour and resulted in a draw thanks to a late point by Sue Ward-Cashman. The replay was staged as a curtain-raiser to the Oireachtas Hurling Final between Kilkenny and Clare at Croke Park on 15 October, which attracted an attendance of 15,879. Agnes Hourigan wrote in the Irish Press:

Giving a truly spectacular exhibition of the game that drew round after round of applause from the appreciative Oireachtas crowd, Antrim deservedly won. Only for a brief three-minute period in the second half did they lose command of proceedings. In those three minutes the game took a really dramatic turn. Leading by seven points 2-8 to 0-7 and even against wind and elements, seemed cruising to victory with just ten minutes to go, the Antrim side were rocked back on their heels when goals by Kit Kehoe and Úna O'Connor followed by a neat point from Una, brought the sides level in an amazing two-minute spell. But the Antrim mentors quickly reacted to the challenge. They moved Eileen Collins to right wing and Mairéad Carabine to left forward and the change brought quick dividends. Three minutes later a great line ball by Sue Cashman was finished to the net by Mairéad Carabine for the decisive goal of the match. She scored again but this time the goal was disallowed for a square infringement and it was left to Marion McFetridge to clinch Antrim’s victory with a well taken point two minutes from time.

The winning team adjourned to the Old Sheiling in Raheny to celebrate their success. Their mascot was 10-month-old Paula McFetridge.

Final stages

Drawn Final 17 September Antrim 4-2 Dublin 4-2

 
MATCH RULES
50 minutes
Replay if scores level
Maximum of 3 substitutions

Replay Oct 17 Antrim 3-9 Dublin 4-2

 
MATCH RULES
50 minutes
Replay if scores level
Maximum of 3 substitutions

See also
 All-Ireland Senior Hurling Championship
 Wikipedia List of Camogie players
 National Camogie League
 Camogie All Stars Awards
 Ashbourne Cup

References

External links
 Camogie Association
 Historical reports of All Ireland finals
 All-Ireland Senior Camogie Championship: Roll of Honour
 Camogie on facebook
 Camogie on GAA Oral History Project

All-Ireland Senior Camogie Championship
1967
All-Ireland Senior Camogie Championship
All-Ireland Senior Camogie Championship
All-Ireland Senior Camogie Championship